WrestleMania 39 (marketed as WrestleMania Goes Hollywood) is the upcoming 39th annual WrestleMania professional wrestling pay-per-view (PPV) and livestreaming event produced by WWE. It will be held for wrestlers from the promotion's Raw and SmackDown brand divisions. The event is scheduled to be held as a two-night event, taking place on April 1 and 2, 2023, at SoFi Stadium in Inglewood, California—the original location of WrestleMania 37 before the COVID-19 pandemic forced it to be relocated. WWE wrestler The Miz will serve as the official host for the event.

WrestleMania 39 will be the sixth to be held in Greater Los Angeles (after 2, VII, XII, 2000, and 21), and the seventh in the state of California overall (including 31, which was held in the San Francisco Bay Area). This will also be the first WrestleMania to take place under Triple H's creative control, following the retirement of Vince McMahon in July 2022; McMahon had served as Chairman and Chief Executive Officer of the company since 1982 and created WrestleMania in 1985, and although he returned to the company in January 2023 as Executive Chairman, this did not affect Triple H's position. It will also be the first WrestleMania to livestream on Binge.

Production

Background 

WrestleMania is WWE's flagship pay-per-view (PPV) and livestreaming event, having first been held in 1985. It was the company's first PPV produced and was also WWE's first major event available via livestreaming when the company launched the WWE Network in February 2014. It is the longest-running professional wrestling event in history and is held annually between mid-March to mid-April. Along with Royal Rumble, SummerSlam, Survivor Series, and Money in the Bank, it is one of the company's five biggest events of the year, referred to as the "Big Five". WrestleMania is ranked the sixth-most valuable sports brand in the world by Forbes, and has been described as the Super Bowl of sports entertainment. Much like the Super Bowl, cities bid for the right to host the year's edition of WrestleMania. WrestleMania 39 will feature wrestlers from the Raw and SmackDown brand divisions. On February 27, 2023, it was revealed that current WWE wrestler The Miz would serve as the host of the event.

On February 10, 2020, WWE announced that SoFi Stadium in Inglewood, California would host WrestleMania 37 on March 28, 2021, with the event being promoted as "WrestleMania Goes Hollywood" (the same tagline used for WrestleMania 21 in 2005). Wrestling journalist Dave Meltzer reported that WWE had originally pushed for SoFi Stadium to host WrestleMania in 2022, so it could promote the event as having a larger overall attendance than Super Bowl LVI (which was held at the same venue in February of that year). However, Inglewood city officials preferred that WrestleMania be held in 2021 to prepare for Super Bowl LVI.

In the midst of the COVID-19 pandemic in October 2020, however, the Wrestling Observer Newsletter reported that WWE was considering relocating WrestleMania 37, as the state of the COVID-19 pandemic in California made it increasingly unlikely that the event could be held with in-person spectators on the scheduled date. WWE had reportedly planned to relocate the event to Raymond James Stadium in Tampa, Florida, which was originally scheduled to host WrestleMania 36 before the onset of the pandemic forced it to be scaled back and held at WWE's Orlando training facility instead. In late-September 2020, Florida governor Ron DeSantis lifted all mandatory capacity restrictions in the state, although sports teams continued to voluntarily impose capacity restrictions based on federal guidance. California allowed outdoor stadiums to re-open to in-state visitors only beginning April 1, 2021, with capacity restricted based on case positivity in individual regions.

On January 16, 2021, WWE announced that WrestleMania 37 would in fact be relocated to Tampa. Along with this announcement, WWE revealed that SoFi Stadium would still host a WrestleMania, but it would instead be WrestleMania 39 in April 2023—WrestleMania 38 was announced for AT&T Stadium in Arlington, Texas in 2022. WrestleMania 39 will be the first since WrestleMania 21 to be held in Greater Los Angeles, and the seventh held in the state of California (after 2, VII, XII, 2000, 21, and 31). WrestleMania 39 in turn also adopted the "Hollywood" marketing originally intended for WrestleMania 37. The event was originally announced to be held solely on Sunday, April 2, 2023, but during WrestleMania 38, it was revealed that like the previous three WrestleMania events, WrestleMania 39 was expanded to a two-night event, scheduled for Saturday, April 1 and Sunday, April 2.

Tickets for the event went on sale on August 12, 2022. WWE also announced that WrestleMania Priority Passes would be available beginning July 22. These passes include premier seating, a dedicated stadium entrance, premium hospitality offerings, and meet-and-greets with current WWE wrestlers and legends. Ticket sales for WrestleMania 39 set a company record, with over 90,000 tickets sold within the first 24 hours, more than any other WWE event in history.

WrestleMania was created by WWE owner Vince McMahon. In July 2022, McMahon announced his retirement, after having served as Chairman and Chief Executive Officer (CEO) of the company since 1982. His daughter, Stephanie McMahon, along with WWE president Nick Khan, took over as co-CEOs, and the former also took over as Chairwoman of WWE. Vince's son-in-law—Stephanie's husband—Paul "Triple H" Levesque took over creative control. Stephanie would resign as co-CEO and Chairwoman in January 2023, and Vince would return as Executive Chairman while Khan became the sole CEO. Although Vince returned in an executive role, Triple H maintained complete creative control of booking WWE's storylines.

Broadcast outlets 
In addition to airing on traditional pay-per-view, WrestleMania 39 will be available to livestream on Peacock in the United States and the WWE Network in most international markets. It will also be the first WrestleMania to livestream on Binge in Australia after the Australian version of the WWE Network merged under Foxtel's channel Binge in January.

Other WrestleMania Weekend events 
As part of the WrestleMania festivities, WWE will hold a number of events throughout the week. The night before WrestleMania 39 on March 31, WWE will kick off WrestleMania Weekend with a special "WrestleMania Edition" of SmackDown. Immediately after SmackDown, the 2023 WWE Hall of Fame induction ceremony will commence. The day of WrestleMania Saturday, WWE's developmental brand NXT will hold its annual WrestleMania Weekend event, Stand & Deliver. WrestleMania Weekend will conclude with the Raw after WrestleMania on April 3. All of these events will be held live at the Crypto.com Arena in Downtown Los Angeles.

On February 1, 12 WWE wrestlers participated in the filming of an episode of Wheel of Fortune for a WWE-themed week that is set to air during WrestleMania week. WWE Hall of Famer The Undertaker will also bring his 1 deadMAN Show to Los Angeles during WrestleMania week, which will be held at The Novo at L.A. Live on March 31. The one-man show has Undertaker telling stories from his 30-year career.

Celebrity involvement
As is tradition at WrestleMania, celebrities outside of WWE will be involved in various roles. Pop/reggaeton singer Becky G will perform "America the Beautiful" for Night 1, while country singer Jimmie Allen will do the same for Night 2.

Storylines 
The event will include matches that each result from scripted storylines, where wrestlers portray heroes, villains, or less distinguishable characters in scripted events that build tension and culminate in a wrestling match or series of matches. Results are predetermined by WWE's writers on the Raw and SmackDown brands, while storylines are produced on WWE's weekly television shows, Monday Night Raw and Friday Night SmackDown.

At WrestleMania 38, Cody Rhodes made a surprise return to WWE after having been away from the company for six years—during his time away, he established himself on the independent circuit and helped found WWE's rival promotion, All Elite Wrestling, in January 2019. At the same event, Roman Reigns became the Undisputed WWE Universal Champion by retaining his Universal Championship and winning the WWE Championship. On the Raw after WrestleMania, Rhodes stated that he returned to win the WWE Championship, not only for himself, but also for his late father, Dusty, who never won the title. In June, Rhodes suffered a pectoral injury, which sidelined him for several months. At the 2023 Royal Rumble, Rhodes returned and won the men's Royal Rumble match to earn a match against Reigns for the Undisputed WWE Universal Championship at WrestleMania 39. While Rhodes simply wanted to win the championship to bring honor to his family, Reigns, by way of his special counsel Paul Heyman, made it personal, with Heyman stating that Dusty's last words to him were that although Cody was his favorite son, Reigns, who Dusty trained, was the son he always wanted. On the March 3 episode of SmackDown, Rhodes confronted Reigns face-to-face for the first time. Rhodes claimed that throughout his career, he had always overcome the odds and would do it again at WrestleMania. Reigns reinforced what Heyman had said, and then told Rhodes that at WrestleMania, if there was anything that Dusty did not teach his own son, Reigns would.

At the Royal Rumble, Raw's Rhea Ripley won the women's Royal Rumble match to earn a women's championship match of her choice at WrestleMania 39. On the following episode of Raw, she chose to challenge Charlotte Flair for the SmackDown Women's Championship, setting up a WrestleMania rematch between the two from WrestleMania 36 in 2020, where Flair had won that year's Royal Rumble and had chosen and defeated Ripley for the NXT Women's Championship. This subsequently marks the first women's WrestleMania rematch to happen at a WrestleMania.

Due to the aforementioned women's Royal Rumble match winner choosing the SmackDown Women's Championship, an Elimination Chamber match was scheduled for the eponymous event to determine Bianca Belair's challenger for the Raw Women's Championship at WrestleMania 39. The match was won by Asuka.

On the February 20 episode of Raw, Omos and his manager MVP addressed the match between Brock Lesnar and Bobby Lashley from Elimination Chamber. MVP called Lesnar a coward and claimed that Lesnar intentionally disqualified himself because Lesnar knew he could not break Lashley's Hurt Lock submission. MVP then invited Lesnar to Raw the following week to accept Omos' challenge for a match at WrestleMania 39. The following week, after MVP sold him on the match, Lesnar accepted.

On the March 3 episode of SmackDown, a fatal five-way match between Drew McIntyre, LA Knight, Sheamus, Kofi Kingston, and Karrion Kross was announced for the following week, where the winner would face Gunther for the Intercontinental Championship at WrestleMania 39. On March 9, it was announced that due to an injury, Kingston's New Day tag team partner Xavier Woods would replace him in the match. A double pinfall occurred in the match, with McIntyre and Sheamus named co-winners. It was then announced that the two would face each other the following week to determine the definitive number one contender, however, that match ended in a no-contest after Imperium (Gunther, Ludwig Kaiser, and Giovanni Vinci) attacked both men. It was then announced that Gunther would defend the championship against both McIntyre and Sheamus in a triple threat match at WrestleMania 39.

Since April 2022, Austin Theory and John Cena had been teasing a match against each other over social media. The two briefly came face-to-face during Cena's 20-year anniversary celebration on the June 27, 2022, episode of Raw, where Theory mocked Cena and called him out of touch. In February 2023, during the Elimination Chamber post-event press conference after Theory had retained the United States Championship at the event, Theory was annoyed that everyone was asking about Cena instead of his own accomplishments. After it was announced that Cena would be making his return on the March 6 episode of Raw, Theory stated that he would be giving him a warm welcome back. Theory confronted Cena on that episode and claimed that Cena was an inspiration to him and then challenged Cena to face him at WrestleMania 39 for the United States Championship, however, Cena declined as he felt Theory was not ready. After some coaxing from Theory, Cena allowed his hometown of Boston to decide, and they cheered to see the match, which prompted Cena to accept the challenge.

At the Royal Rumble, Logan Paul, who had been out with an injury since Crown Jewel in November 2022, made a surprise return as an entrant in the men's Royal Rumble match and eliminated Seth "Freakin" Rollins. Following this, Rollins began bad mouthing Paul in interviews, stating that he did not want Paul to be in WWE. At Elimination Chamber during the titular match, Paul snuck into the Chamber and attacked Rollins, costing him the United States Championship. Paul accepted Rollins' invitation to appear on the March 6 episode of Raw, where Rollins wanted to fight only for Paul to decline and state that he would not fight for free and hinted that they could fight at WrestleMania 39. WrestleMania host The Miz then claimed that he could make the match official, and it was later confirmed. On his Impaulsive podcast, Paul said that the match would be happening on Night 1.

At SummerSlam in July 2022, Bayley made her return alongside Dakota Kai and Iyo Sky after Becky Lynch's match. Lynch would take time off due to an attack from Bayley, Kai, and Sky and the three dubbed themselves as Damage CTRL. Lynch made her return in November 2022, and led her team in defeating Damage CTRL's team in a WarGames match at Survivor Series WarGames. Over the next few weeks, Damage CTRL continued targeting Lynch and on the February 6, 2023, episode of Raw, during a Steel Cage match between Lynch and Bayley, WWE Hall of Famer Lita returned and prevented Sky and Kai from interfering in the match, allowing Lynch to defeat Bayley. Lynch and Lita then defeated Sky and Kai on the February 27 episode to win the WWE Women's Tag Team Championship, thanks to returning fellow Hall of Famer, Trish Stratus, who prevented Bayley from interfering. The following week, Stratus, who had retired at SummerSlam in 2019, stated that she was coming out of retirement so that she, Lynch, and Lita could challenge Damage CTRL to a six-woman tag team match at WrestleMania 39 and Damage CTRL accepted.

At WrestleMania 38, Edge won his match thanks to a distraction from Damian Priest. The two then formed a faction named The Judgment Day. Over the next couple of months, Rhea Ripley and Finn Bálor would also be added to the group. In June, however, Bálor, Priest, and Ripley turned on Edge, kicking him out of the group. In September, The Judgment Day recruited Dominik Mysterio. Edge continued his feud with The Judgment Day over the next few months, and he and his wife Beth Phoenix teamed up to defeat Bálor and Ripley at Elimination Chamber. On the following episode of Raw, Edge, who felt his feud with The Judgment Day was over, lost his United States Championship match after interference from Bálor. The following week, Bálor said their feud was not done and challenged Edge to a match at WrestleMania 39. On the following week's episode, Edge interfered in Bálor's match, causing him to lose, and Edge challenged Bálor to meet him alone on the next episode. There, the two agreed to a Hell in a Cell match at WrestleMania 39.

On the March 17 episode of SmackDown, it was announced that there would be two WrestleMania Showcase fatal four-way tag team matches - one each for the men's and women's division - at WrestleMania 39. Qualifying matches began that night. Liv Morgan and Raquel Rodriguez qualified first for the women's match by defeating Tegan Nox and Emma.

Matches

References

External links 
 

2023 WWE Network events
2023 WWE pay-per-view events
2023 in Los Angeles County, California
April 2023 events in the United States
Events in Inglewood, California
WrestleMania
Scheduled professional wrestling shows
Professional wrestling in California
Sports competitions in Inglewood, California
2023 in professional wrestling